List of The Tom and Jerry Show episodes may refer to:

 List of The Tom and Jerry Show (1975 TV series) episodes
 List of The Tom and Jerry Show (2014 TV series) episodes